The Sang Saka Malaya is the flag of the Parti Kebangsaan Melayu Malaya. It is also known as Sang Saka Merah Putih.

The flag features twelve stars arranged in three rows of four columns. It was introduced in 1947 by the combination of two political parties, PUTERA and AMCJA, as a proposal to the flag of an independent Federation of Malaya. The twelve stars represent the 12 states of the Malay Peninsula. It follows the concept of the American flag with 50 stars representing the 50 states that make up the United States.

The Sang Saka Malaya flag is the flag of the Left movement fighting for independence without the involvement of the Malay rulers, and therefore can be said to tend towards the formation of a republic, (through integration with Indonesia) the same as happened in Indonesia, where the local kings had been stripped of power.

Sang Saka Malaya (2007) refers to the flag designed by Angkatan Muda Keadilan (PKR Youth) leader, Najwan Halimi. This flag was carried by supporters of Himpunan Janji Demokrasi   with the red and white flag design together with the crescent moon and a star with 11 vertices. The Sang Saka Malaya (2007) became the central point in the national flag controversy that had arisen around the 56th anniversary of Malaysia's independence in 2013.

General 
It was brought by the delegates of PKMM, led by Dr. Burhanuddin al-Helmy, to the Asian Regional Conference held at the end of 1947 in New Delhi, India. However, Angkatan Muda Keadilan (PKR Youth) leader, Najwan Halimi has claimed he was the designer of a similar flag carried by supporters of Himpunan Janji Demokrasi in 2007.

The 2007 design red-white flag features the crescent moon and a star with 11 vertices, whilst the Sang Saka Malaya design announced on 11 November 1947 in Singapore is red and white with 12 yellow stars to represent the 12 states in Malaya.

The 1947 flag was hoisted for the first time in the Malayan Democratic Union Building, Singapore

The red and white flag, called just Sang Saka, that was used by groups which supported the creation of Indonesia Raya was first brought to Malaya by Kesatuan Melayu Muda (KMM) in 1938 led by Ibrahim Yaacob.

Kesatuan Melayu Muda (KMM) had been fighting for independence for Malaya to be affiliated with the Republic of Indonesia Raya or Melayu Raya and to set aside the monarchy. However, most of the Malays in Malaya at that time, (circa 1938) did not agree with their cause because the Malays supported the institution of the Malay Rulers and Islam. For the most part, the Malays chose the UMNO struggle to uphold the institution of the Malay Rulers and Islam .

After Kesatuan Melayu Muda (KMM) was banned, the Parti Kebangsaan Melayu Malaya (PKMM) led by Mokhtaruddin Lasso, Dr. Burhanuddin al-Helmy and Ahmad Boestamam continued the ideological struggle. PKMM adopted the Indonesian republican flag as its own.

At midnight on New Year's Eve 2012, a group called "Aktivis Sang Saka" flew the Sang Saka Malaya flag, lofted with a cluster of twelve gas balloons, at Masjid Jamek LRT Station on the intersection of Jalan Raja and Jalan Tun Perak, near Dataran Merdeka in the capital of Malaysia, Kuala Lumpur. When questioned by police about half an hour after the incident, one activists, Muhammad Nasir Abu Bakar, said that they were flying the flag to commemorate the Malayan leftist liberation struggle " for transparency and truth."

Usage 
The Sang Saka Malaya was flag of the Persatuan Kesatuan Melayu Muda (PKMM  a.k.a. Malay Youth Association) which was not aligned to Malayan royalty. It was never officially used by a state in Malaysia. According to the Head of the History, Heritage and Socio-Cultural Unit of the Majlis Professor Negara (MPN a.k.a. National Council of Professors), Prof Datuk Dr Zainal Kling, the Sang Saka (with red and white background only) has been used by states in Maritime Southeast Asia since time immemorial. It was not the original Malayan flag.

References

History of Malaya
History of Malaysia
Flags of Malaysia